The year 2003 is the 7th year in the history of the Pride Fighting Championships, a mixed martial arts promotion based in Japan. 2003 had 6 events beginning with, Pride 25 - Body Blow.

Title fights

Debut Pride FC fighters

The following fighters fought their first Pride FC fight in 2003:

 Alberto Rodriguez
 Aleksander Emelianenko
 Chalid Arrab
 Chris Brennan
 Dan Bobish
 Dokonjonosuke Mishima
 Hayato Sakurai
 Ikuhisa Minowa

 Jason Suttie
 Kazuhiro Hamanaka
 Kazuhiro Nakamura
 Maurício Rua
 Mike Bencic
 Mikhail Ilyukhin
 Murilo Bustamante
 Paulo Cesar Silva

 Ralph Gracie
 Rodney Glunder
 Rodrigo Gracie
 Rony Sefo
 Sergei Kharitonov
 Wataru Sakata
 Yuki Kondo

Events list

Pride 25: Body Blow

Pride 25: Body Blow was an event held on March 16, 2003 at the Yokohama Arena in Yokohama, Japan.

Results

Pride 26: Bad to the Bone

Pride 26: Bad to the Bone was an event held on June 8, 2003 at the Yokohama Arena in Yokohama, Japan.

Results

Pride FC: Total Elimination 2003

Pride FC: Total Elimination 2003 was an event held on August 10, 2003 at the Saitama Super Arena in Saitama, Japan.

Results

Pride 2003 Middleweight Grand Prix bracket

Pride FC: Bushido 1

Pride FC: Bushido 1 Is an event held by the Pride Fighting Championships at the Saitama Super Arena in Saitama, Japan on October 5, 2003. The card was billed as Team Japan Vs. Team Gracie, with five bouts featuring a Japanese fighter represented by Hidehiko Yoshida and a member of the Gracie family represented by Royce Gracie. In the main event, Dos Caras, Jr. became the first Hispanic fighter to compete in Pride and the first to wear a lucha libre mask during a bout. He is now better known as WWE pro wrestler Alberto Del Rio.

Results

Pride FC: Final Conflict 2003

Pride FC: Final Conflict 2003 was an event held on November 9, 2003 at the Tokyo Dome in Tokyo, Japan. This event was host to the semi-finals and finals of the 2003 Pride Middleweight Grand Prix tournament.  The first round of the tournament was contested at the Pride: Total Elimination 2003 event the previous August.

Results

Pride 2003 Middleweight Grand Prix bracket

Pride FC: Shockwave 2003

Pride FC: Shockwave 2003 was an event held on December 31, 2003 at the Saitama Super Arena in Saitama, Japan.

Results

See also
 Pride Fighting Championships
 List of Pride Fighting Championships champions
 List of Pride Fighting events

References

Pride Fighting Championships events
2003 in mixed martial arts